Mount Gleaton  is a mountain,  high, that overlooks Tucker Glacier from the north, standing near the end of the ridge just north of Helman Glacier, in the Admiralty Mountains of Antarctica. It was mapped by the United States Geological Survey (USGS) from surveys and U.S. Navy air photos, 1960–62, and was named by the Advisory Committee on Antarctic Names for Clarence E. Gleaton, Chief Warrant Officer, US Army, a helicopter pilot in support of the USGS Topo North–South survey of this area, 1961–62.

References

Mountains of Victoria Land
Borchgrevink Coast